Zacorisca thiasodes is a species of moth of the family Tortricidae. It is found on New Guinea.

The wingspan is 36–40 mm. The forewings are orange with bright deep purple-blue markings. The hindwings are blackish purple with a deep orange terminal fascia.

References

	

Moths described in 1910
Zacorisca